SS Almeda Star, originally SS Almeda, was a British turbine steamer of the Blue Star Line. She was both an ocean liner and a refrigerated cargo ship, providing a passenger service between London and South America and carrying refrigerated beef from South America to London. She was built in 1926, significantly enlarged in 1935 and sunk by enemy action in 1941.

Building and early career
In 1925 Blue Star ordered a set of new liners for its new London – Rio de Janeiro – Buenos Aires route. Cammell Laird of Birkenhead built three sister ships: Almeda, Andalucia and Arandora. John Brown & Company of Clydebank built two: Avelona and Avila. Together the quintet came to be called the "luxury five".

Cammell Laird launched Almeda on 29 June 1926 and completed her in December. She was launched under her original name of Almeda. Her boilers supplied steam at 200 lbf/in2 to four Parsons steam turbines with a combined rating of 2,078 NHP or 13,880 shp.

Almeda was painted in Blue Star Line's standard livery of the era. Her hull was black, her boot-topping red and her masts white. Her stokehold ventilators were black and her deck ventilators were white, and the insides of her ventilator cowls were red. She had two funnels and they were red with a black top, with a narrow white and a narrow black band and on each side a large blue star on a white disc. In her original form Almedas funnels had a type of cowl called an "Admiralty top".

Almeda made her maiden voyage on 16 February 1927, inaugurating Blue Star Line's route between London and Buenos Aires via Boulogne, Madeira, Tenerife, Rio de Janeiro, Santos and Montevideo. Her passage was scheduled to take 18 or 19 days.

In the course of 1927 Cammell Laird completed two sister ships, SS Andalucia and SS Arandora.

Rebuilding
The new section in each ship was inserted forward of the accommodation block. This design, pioneered by Austrian shipbuilding engineer Fritz Maier and developed by his son Erich Maier, had a convex profile that was intended to increase hydrodynamic efficiency.

The combined rating of her turbines was reduced to 1,909 NHP. A change more visible externally was that the Admiralty tops were removed from Almeda Stars two funnels.

War service and sinking

After the Second World War broke out in September 1939 Almeda Star continued to sail her route independently of convoys. On 29 September 1939 off Rio de Janeiro she was met by the Royal Navy cruiser , which was looking for British and Allied ships to escort northwards because of the threat of German raiders in the area.

On 22 December 1940 Almeda Star was on the River Mersey in Liverpool when she was slightly damaged in an air raid. On 15 January she sailed from Liverpool bound for the River Plate, carrying 194 passengers including 142 members of the Fleet Air Arm en route to RNAS Piarco on Trinidad. They were 21 officers and 121 ratings from 749, 750 and 752 squadrons.

Shipping between Britain and the Atlantic had to pass through the Western Approaches, so this area attracted a number of U-boat attacks. On the morning of 16 January, the day after Almeda Star sailed,  had sunk the passenger liner  in the Western Approaches, killing 106 of the people aboard.

The ship did not immediately sink so U-96 fired again at 0805 and 0907 hrs, hitting Almeda Star in the stern and again amidships. The ship had launched four lifeboats but still had people on deck when U-96 surfaced and opened fire on her with her 88 mm deck gun. Between 0932 and 0948 hrs the submarine fired 28 incendiary shells, about 15 of which hit Almeda Star and started small fires aboard. The fires soon went out so at 0955 hrs U-96 hit the ship with a fourth torpedo, which exploded in her forepart. Within three minutes Almeda Star sank by her bow.

Almeda Star had transmitted one distress message and the Royal Navy responded by sending seven destroyers to search the area. They found neither survivors, boats nor wreckage: all 360 people aboard were lost, including those in the four lifeboats that had been launched. U-96 had been at the scene for more than two hours but escaped undetected.

References

Sources and further reading

1926 ships
Cargo liners
Maritime incidents in January 1941
Ocean liners of the United Kingdom
Ships built on the River Mersey
Ships lost with all hands
Ships of the Blue Star Line
Ships sunk by German submarines in World War II
Steamships of the United Kingdom
World War II shipwrecks in the Atlantic Ocean